John Bunch (December 1, 1921 – March 30, 2010) was an American jazz pianist.

Early life
Born and raised in Tipton, Indiana, a small farming community, Bunch studied piano with George Johnson, a Hoosier jazz pianist. By the age of 14, he was already playing with adult bands in central Indiana.

Later life and career
During World War II, he enlisted in the Army Air Forces and became a bombardier on a B17 Flying Fortress. He and his ten-man crew were transferred to combat duty in England, flying bombing missions over Germany. His plane was shot down on November 2, 1944, and Bunch was taken prisoner. In the prison camp, he learned to arrange for big bands.

After the war, he applied for university training as a music major, but was refused because he could not sight read classical music. He worked later in factories and insurance. In 1956, he moved to Los Angeles where he immediately was accepted by jazz musicians such as Georgie Auld and Jimmie Rowles, who later recommended him to Woody Herman. He settled in New York in 1958, where he joined Eddie Condon and Maynard Ferguson. He recorded with Ferguson and many smaller groups.

In 1966, Bunch joined Tony Bennett as pianist and musical director, and stayed with the singer until 1972. During that time he appeared on Bennett's 1972 series for Thames Television, Tony Bennett at the Talk of the Town. After that, he resumed his jazz work, performing and recording with Benny Goodman, Buddy Rich, Gene Krupa, Pearl Bailey, and Scott Hamilton. He led a trio, mostly in England, and made many recordings as a leader, such as with the New York Swing Trio with Bucky Pizzarelli and Jay Leonhart.

Bunch remained active in Europe and the United States during his final years. He died of melanoma in Roosevelt Hospital, Manhattan, New York City, on March 30, 2010. He was survived by his wife, Cecily "Chips" Gemmell, a former private secretary to Winston Churchill.

Discography

As leader/co-leader

As sideman
With Benny Bailey
The Satchmo Legacy (Enja, 2000)
With Buck Clayton and Tommy Gwaltney's Kansas City 9
 Goin' to Kansas City (Riverside, 1960)
With Kenny Davern
 Live at the Floating Jazz Festival
 The Jazz KENnection
With Maynard Ferguson
 A Message from Newport (Roulette, 1958)
With Gene Krupa
 The Great New Gene Krupa Quartet Featuring Charlie Ventura (Verve, 1964)
With Donnie O'Brien
 Donnie O' Brien Meets Manhattan Swing: In a Basie Mood (Arbors)
With Bucky Pizzarelli
 Five for Freddie (Arbors)
With Rex Stewart and Dicky Wells
Chatter Jazz (RCA Victor, 1959)

External Links

References

1921 births
2010 deaths
American jazz pianists
American male pianists
Deaths from cancer in New York (state)
Deaths from melanoma
Musicians from Indiana
People from Tipton, Indiana
World War II prisoners of war held by Germany
20th-century American pianists
20th-century American male musicians
American male jazz musicians
United States Army Air Forces personnel of World War II
Chiaroscuro Records artists
Concord Records artists
Arbors Records artists